USS Brave has been the name of two ships in the United States Navy.  Both ships served concurrently during World War II with YP-425 dropping the name Brave in 1942.

, a coastal patrol craft.
, an auxiliary ship used for training.

References

United States Navy ship names